Raising a Riot is a 1955 British comedy film directed by Wendy Toye and starring Kenneth More, Shelagh Fraser and Mandy Miller about a naval officer who attempts to look after his three children in his wife's absence.

Plot summary
Commander Peter Kent of the Royal Navy and his wife May have three children, ranging from five to eleven years: Peter, Anne and Fusty. Kent comes home after three years abroad with no idea how to handle the children. When Mary has to fly to Canada, Peter takes his children to his father's new country home, which turns out to be a windmill. They end up clashing with an American family in the neighbourhood.

Cast
 Kenneth More as Peter Kent
 Shelagh Fraser as Mary Kent
 Mandy Miller as  Anne Kent
 Gary Billings as Peter Kent
 Fusty Bentine as Fusty Kent
 Ronald Squire as Grampy
 Olga Lindo as Aunt Maud
 Lionel Murton as Hary
 Mary Laura Wood as Jacqueline
 Jan Miller as Sue
 Nora Nicholson as Miss Pettigrew
 Anita Sharp-Bolster as Mrs Buttons
 Michael Bentine as The Professor
 Dorothy Dewhurst as Mother
 Robin Brown as Junior

Production
The film was based on a 1949 book by American writer Alfred Toombs. The book was based on Toombs' real life experience of having to look after his children after having been away from them at war for three years. The book was adapted into a stage play by Tom Taggart in 1952.

One of the children is an uncredited Caroline John, who would later play Liz Shaw in Doctor Who.

In June 1954, filming was about to start on The Alcock and Brown Story for Alexander Kordato be directed by Ken Annakin, produced by Lord Brabourne and Ian Dalrymple and star Kenneth More and Denholm Elliott in the title roles. It would be made under Dalrymple's Wessex Films banner. However Korda then went bankrupt, resulting in the receivers being brought in and the Alcock and Brown movie being cancelled.  Lord Barbourne and Ian Dalrymple arranged with the receiver for that film's unit to be reassigned to a lower budgeted movie instead, Raising a Riot. Kenneth More agreed to star and Annakin was asked to take over the direction. Annakin wrote in his memoirs, "The idea of ‘going back’ to a small family comedy did not thrill me" (he started his directing career with the Hugget family movies) "and when I discovered a young woman called Wendy Toye had actually been preparing this project for months. I turned the offer down flat." Toye directed the film.

Toye called Dalrymple "the most fabulous film producer. He did everything in the world for me. And he really encouraged me and it was his idea for me to do Raising a Riot. And he asked me to show the story to Kenny More and see if I could get him to do it and I did. It was wonderful that he had such faith in me."

It was shot at Shepperton Studios near London with sets designed by the art director Joseph Bato.

Toye said working with children was not difficult "because I chose them very specially. They weren’t acting children, they weren’t from a school of acting. Not that I’m against that but they were the sons and daughters of actors, you get a feeling of it at home, and Jackie Billings little son was the boy and Michael Bentine’s little  daughter Posty."

Reception

Box office
The film was the eighth most popular movie at the British box office in 1955. Kinematograph Weekly called it a "money maker".

According to the National Film Finance Corporation, the film made a comfortable profit.

Critical
The New York Times wrote, "Withal, it makes agreeable entertainment. Mr. More is a comical chap, particularly when he has a dog to cope with, as he had in the memorable Genevieve...Raising a Riot is an amiable little film"; while more recently, the Radio Times called it "an inconsequential, one-joke comedy, kept moving by the polished More, but old-fashioned and rather flat"; and AllMovie described how the film "goes off on several directions, many of them hilarious: some of the best scenes involve the kids' ongoing feud with a bunch of American children."

Variety wrote that:
The main purpose of “Raising a Riot” appears to be to exploit the personality of Kenneth More. This British star, with two major comedy hits (“Genevieve” and "Doctor in the House”) to his credit, has become a major b.o. name here and this pic is nothing more than a frank admit to cash in on that. The trouble with the film is that it lacks Anything like a story. It is just a single situation, moderately amusing in parts, but totally inadequate to sustain a feature pic...Within the strict limitations imposed by the script, the star does remarkably well. More’s timing is flawless and his keen sense of humor is never allowed to flag. 
Toye recalled the film with fondness "because Kenny is so good in it."

References

External links

Raising a Riot at TCMDB
Raising a Riot at BFI
Raising a Riot at Letterbox DVD
1955 films
1955 comedy films
British comedy films
Films directed by Wendy Toye
Films produced by Ian Dalrymple
Films with screenplays by Ian Dalrymple
London Films films
British Lion Films films
Films shot at Shepperton Studios
1950s English-language films
1950s British films